The 2006 GP2 Series season was the second season of the Formula One feeder championship GP2 Series. The season began at Circuit de Valencia, Spain on 8 April 2006 and ended in Monza, Italy on 10 September 2006. The championship was won by ART Grand Prix driver Lewis Hamilton, over Piquet Sports driver Nelson Piquet Jr.

2006 GP2 car modifications

Chassis
The 2006 specification GP2 Car was designed by Dallara Automobili. The 2006 GP2 car featured a biplane rear wing, with the triplane rear wing used in 2005 only to be used at the Monaco race. The front upper and lower wishbones were reinforced, as were the front and rear suspension uprights.

Engine
The 4 litre V8 engine featured internal, cartographic and software upgrades designed to improve performance and fuel consumption.

Gearbox
The 2006 gearbox was manufactured by GearTek, and featured an 8 position barrel, with ratchet body and software upgrades, as well as a new transverse shafts fixing system designed to facilitate improved gear selection.

Tyres
The tyres supplied by Bridgestone for the 2006 season were full-slick, not featuring the four-line grooved slick seen in the 2005 season. Bridgestone supplied a soft, medium, and hard compound tyre, with the tyre choice being made by Bridgestone and the GP2 Series prior to each event. The wet specification tyre remained the same as 2005.

Other parts
Brembo supplied a new development of monobloc brake calipers and disc bells, which were exclusive to GP2. The car also featured internal cooling upgrades, a new water radiator, radiator duct, oil and water heat exchanger, modified oil degasser, new oil and water pipes and new heat exchanger fixing brackets.

Sporting regulations changes
The only change to the sporting regulations for the 2006 season was that drivers would only be awarded a single point for fastest lap in a race, rather than the two points that were awarded in 2005. The driver also had to start the race from his allocated grid position to be eligible to claim the fastest lap.

Season summary
Nelson Piquet Jr. won the first race at Valencia ahead of two rookies, Lewis Hamilton and Adrián Vallés. The latter failed to score in the rest of the season apart from one point for fastest lap at Barcelona. In a sprint race, Vallés was involved in a collision with Adam Carroll who rolled multiple times. The sprint race was won by Michael Ammermüller who had promising start to the season but failed to score during last six weekends.

Gianmaria Bruni and Ernesto Viso then shared victories at Imola, where Hamilton failed to score, after being black-flagged in the feature race and therefore starting the sprint race from back of the grid. Hamilton won both races at Nürburgring, after Piquet took pole position but had a big crash following car failure in the feature race. He also failed to score in the sprint.

Hamilton was on course to win feature race at Barcelona, but he collided with his teammate Alexandre Prémat on the last lap. The Frenchman went on to win with Hamilton second. Viso took his second victory of the season by winning the sprint. Hamilton then won three races in a row, including at Monaco where Nicolas Lapierre and Olivier Pla were injured and did not start. At his home circuit in Silverstone, Hamilton won the feature and then the sprint, where he overtook Clivio Piccione and Piquet in one move.

There were few notable driver changes during the early season. Giorgio Pantano returned to the series with after missing the first three rounds and Timo Glock moved from BCN to iSport between the Monaco and British rounds. Both were serious contenders for race wins for the rest of the season and they shared victories at Magny-Cours. Glock also won at Hockenheim after overtaking José María López on the final lap.

At this point, Hamilton had a 26-point lead over Piquet, but the Brazilian bounced back with a perfect weekend at Hungary, taking pole, two wins and two fastest laps. Hamilton spun in qualifying and started the feature race from back of the grid. He failed to score there but took second place in the wet Sunday sprint.

Piquet's form continued in Turkey, where he won the feature race from pole. Hamilton was second, and in the sprint, he recovered from an early spin to take second place, while Piquet had to settle for fifth. Andreas Zuber took advantage of his front row starting position and won the race.

Hamilton led by ten points before final weekend in Monza. Piquet cut the lead to eight by taking pole. Pantano beat both of them in the feature race and set the fastest lap as well. Piquet finished second and Hamilton third, meaning that the championship would be decided in final race. However, Pantano was deemed to have ignored yellow flags on his fastest lap so that time was disallowed, giving a point to Hamilton who now clinched the title. Pantano made a fantastic start in the sprint and went from 8th to 1st before first corner, and went on to win the race. Hamilton followed and took 2nd, beating Piquet by 12 points in the end.

Teams and drivers
All of the teams used the Dallara GP2/05 chassis with Renault-badged 4.0 litre (244 cu in) naturally-aspirated Mecachrome V8 engines order and with tyres supplied by Bridgestone.

Driver changes
 Changed Teams
 Gianmaria Bruni: Durango → Trident Racing
 Adam Carroll: Super Nova International → Racing Engineering
 Fairuz Fauzy: DAMS → Super Nova International
 Sergio Hernández:  Campos Racing → Durango
 Neel Jani: Racing Engineering → Arden International Ltd
 José María López: DAMS → Super Nova International
 Ferdinando Monfardini: Coloni Motorsport → DAMS
 Giorgio Pantano: Super Nova International → Petrol Ofisi FMS International
 Clivio Piccione: Durango → DPR
 Ernesto Viso: BCN Competición → iSport International

 Entering GP2
 Michael Ammermüller: Eurocup Formula Renault 2.0 & Italian Formula Renault Championship (Jenzer Motorsport) → Arden International Ltd
 Mike Conway: British Formula 3 Championship (Fortec Motorsport) → DPR Direxiv
 Lucas di Grassi: Formula Three Euroseries (Manor Motorsport) → Durango
 Luca Filippi: Italian Formula 3000 (Fisichella Motorsport) → FMS International
 Timo Glock: Champ Car World Series (Rocketsports Racing) → BCN Competición
 Tristan Gommendy: World Series by Renault (Witmeur KTR) → iSport International
 Lewis Hamilton: Formula Three Euroseries (ASM Formule 3) → ART Grand Prix
 Franck Perera: Formula Three Euroseries (Prema Powerteam) → DAMS
 Vitaly Petrov: Formula 1600 Russia (Art Line ProTeam) → DPR
 Félix Porteiro: World Series by Renault (Epsilon by Graff) → Campos Racing
 Jason Tahinci: British Formula Renault Championship (Team JLR) → FMS International
 Adrián Vallés: World Series by Renault (Pons Racing) → Campos Racing
 Javier Villa: Spanish Formula Three Championship (Racing Engineering) → Racing Engineering
 Andreas Zuber: World Series by Renault (Carlin Motorsport) → Trident Racing

 Leaving GP2
 Juan Cruz Álvarez: Campos Racing → Top Race V6 Argentina (Catalan Magni Motorsports)
 Can Artam: iSport International → Retirement
 Borja García: Racing Engineering → World Series by Renault (RC Motorsport)
 Heikki Kovalainen: Arden International  → Formula One (Mild Seven Renault F1 Team test driver)
 Mathias Lauda: Coloni Motorsport → Deutsche Tourenwagen Masters (Persson Motorsport)
 Giorgio Mondini: DPR → A1 Grand Prix (A1 Team Switzerland)
 Nico Rosberg: ART Grand Prix → Formula One (WilliamsF1 Team)
 Ryan Sharp: DPR → World Touring Car Championship (JAS Motorsport)
 Scott Speed: iSport International → Formula One (Scuderia Toro Rosso)
 Toni Vilander: Coloni Motorsport → Italian GT Championship (Playteam Sara Free)

Midseason changes
 Giorgio Pantano replaced Luca Filippi after Nürburg races.
 Timo Glock replaced Tristan Gommendy after Monaco race.
 Luca Filippi replaced Timo Glock after Monaco race.
 Neel Jani replaced Nicolas Lapierre for Silverstone and Magny-Cours races.
 Mike Conway replaced Olivier Pla for Silverstone races.
 Vitaly Petrov replaced Olivier Pla after Magny-Cours races.

Calendar

Results

Championship standings
Scoring system
Points are awarded to the top 8 classified finishers in the Feature race, and to the top 6 classified finishers in the Sprint race. The pole-sitter in the feature race will also receive two points, and one point is given to the driver who set the fastest lap in the feature and sprint races. The driver also had to start the race from his allocated grid position to be eligible to claim the fastest lap and has to drive 90% of race laps. No extra points are awarded to the pole-sitter in the sprint race.

Feature race points

Sprint race points
Points are awarded to the top 6 classified finishers.

Drivers' Championship

Notes:
 Drivers did not finish the race, but were classified as they completed more than 90% of the race distance.
 Lewis Hamilton was disqualified during the first race at Imola for passing the safety car. Team ART Grand Prix's statement on this is that he was following the Campos Racing cars which led him past the car.
 Olivier Pla was disqualified in Montmeló from 8th place for car being under weight limit.
 Durango cars were excluded from second Silverstone race for illegal rear wing which caused di Grassi's accident in first race.
 Felix Porteiro was disqualified from 2nd place in Silverstone sprint race for illegal position of steering rack.

Teams' Championship

Notes

References

External links

GP2 Series & GP2 Asia Series
 Results at autosport.com
 Results at sportresultaten.be

GP2 Series season 2006
GP2 Series seasons
GP2 Series